is the fourth studio album by Japanese band Wagakki Band and their final studio release under Avex Trax. It was released on April 25, 2018 in five editions: CD only, two music video editions, and two live concert editions with DVD or Blu-ray discs. The live concert editions feature the Wagakki Band Premium Symphonic Night ~ Live & Orchestra ~ in Osaka-jō Hall show. In addition, a mu-mo Shop exclusive box set was released, featuring an instrumental CD, both music video and concert DVDs and Blu-ray discs.

The album includes the song "Yukikage-Boushi", which was used by used car dealership chain Gulliver for their 2018 New Year sale commercial featuring the band. "Sasameyuki" was used as the ending theme of the anime TV series Holmes of Kyoto.

Otonoe peaked at No. 2 on Oricon's albums chart. The album received the Excellent Album Award at the 60th Japan Record Awards.

Track listing
All tracks are arranged by Wagakki Band.

Personnel 
 Yuko Suzuhana – vocals
 Machiya – guitar
 Beni Ninagawa – tsugaru shamisen
 Kiyoshi Ibukuro – koto
 Asa – bass
 Daisuke Kaminaga – shakuhachi
 Wasabi – drums
 Kurona – wadaiko

Charts

References

External links 
 
  (Avex Group)
 
 

Wagakki Band albums
2018 albums
Japanese-language albums
Avex Trax albums